Blueprints at Addison Circle is a steel sculpture located in Addison, Texas inside a  roundabout. The sculpture consists of 25 poles and five art panels. The sculpture weighs  and required  of custom "Sharpie blue" paint. It was designed by landscape architect Michael Van Valkenburgh and artist Mel Chin with the aid of LeMessurier Consultants, and was fabricated and erected by Big D Metalworks of Dallas. The poles weighing  were made in Houston, Texas and the tapered cones at the top of the poles were made in New Jersey. The structure was dedicated on April 13, 2000.

The design is said to resemble the branching pattern of a grove of oak trees. The five art panels were designed using actual blueprints from Addison's municipal buildings, parks, bridges, and water pumping facilities. Total cost for the sculpture was $2.1 million. The nighttime lighting was designed by Stephen Bernstein of Cline Bettridge Bernstein Lighting Design.

Gallery

External links

addisontexas.net
addisontexas.gov
virtualtourist.com
archlighting.com

Outdoor sculptures in Texas
2000 sculptures
Steel sculptures in Texas
Buildings and structures in Dallas County, Texas